Shenmue is a 1999 action-adventure game developed and published by Sega for the Dreamcast. It follows the teenage martial artist Ryo Hazuki as he sets out in revenge for the murder of his father in 1980s Yokosuka, Japan. The player explores an open world, fighting opponents in brawler battles and encountering quick time events. The environmental detail was considered unprecedented, with numerous interactive objects, a day-and-night system, variable weather effects, non-player characters with daily schedules and various minigames.

After developing several successful Sega arcade games, including Hang-On (1985), Out Run (1986) and Virtua Fighter (1993), director Yu Suzuki wanted to create a longer experience, and conceived Shenmue as a multi-part epic. In 1996, Sega AM2 began work on a role-playing game for the Sega Saturn set in the Virtua Fighter world. Development moved to the Dreamcast in 1997 and the Virtua Fighter connection was dropped.

Despite sales of 1.2 million, Shenmue did not recoup its development cost and was a commercial failure. It received positive reviews for its graphics, soundtrack and ambition, though its slow pace and emphasis on mundane detail divided players. It attracted a cult following, appeared in several lists of the greatest video games of all time, and is credited for pioneering game mechanics such as quick time events and open worlds. Later appraisal has been mixed, with criticism for its controls, pace and voice acting.

After the release of Shenmue II, further Shenmue games entered development hell and Suzuki left Sega. In 2018, Sega released high-definition ports of Shenmue and Shenmue II for multiple formats. Following a successful crowdfunding campaign, Suzuki developed Shenmue III independently; it was released for the PlayStation 4 and Windows in 2019. An anime adaptation of Shenmue premiered in 2022.

Gameplay 
The player controls the teenage martial artist Ryo Hazuki as he investigates his father's murder in Yokosuka in 1986. They must explore the open world, searching for clues, examining objects and talking to non-player characters. Occasionally, Ryo battles opponents in fighting sequences similar to Sega's Virtua Fighter series; outside of combat, players can practice moves to increase their power. In quick time events, the player must press the right button within a time limit to succeed.

Shenmue features a persistent world with level of detail considered unprecedented for games at the time. Shops open and close, buses run to timetables, and characters have their own routines, each in accordance with the in-game clock. The player can inspect objects including drawers, cabinets and shelves, though not all objects are interactive. Ryo receives a daily allowance which can be spent on items including food, raffle tickets, audio cassettes and capsule toys. There are several minigames; in the local arcade, for example, Ryo can throw darts or play complete versions of the Sega arcade games Hang-On and Space Harrier. Later in the game, Ryo gets a part-time job at the docks and must ferry crates between warehouses and compete in races using a forklift.

Edge described Shenmue as "a game of middle management, often composed of the unglamorous daily grinds—being home for bedtime, wisely spending money earned from a day job, or training combat moves through lonely practice—that other games bypass".

Plot 
In Yokosuka, Japan, 1986, the teenage martial artist Ryo Hazuki returns to his family dojo to witness a confrontation between his father Iwao and a Chinese man, Lan Di. Lan Di easily incapacitates Ryo, and threatens to kill him unless Iwao gives him a mysterious stone artifact known as the dragon mirror. Iwao tells him the mirror is buried under the cherry blossom tree outside. As his men recover the mirror, Lan Di mentions a man he claims Iwao killed in China. He delivers a finishing blow and Iwao dies in Ryo's arms.

Swearing revenge on Lan Di, Ryo begins his investigation by asking locals about what they witnessed. As he is about to run out of leads, a letter addressed to Ryo's father arrives from a Chinese man named Zhu Yuanda suggesting he seek the aid of Master Chen, who works at Yokosuka Harbor. Through Chen and his son Guizhang, Ryo learns that the mirror taken by Lan Di is one of two. He locates the second, the phoenix mirror, in a hidden basement beneath his father's dojo.

Chen reveals that Lan Di has left Japan for Hong Kong. Ryo borrows money to buy a plane ticket from a disreputable travel agency; when he goes to collect the ticket, he is ambushed by Chai, a member of Lan Di's criminal organization, the Chi You Men, who destroys his ticket. Ryo learns that the Chi You Men is connected to the local harbor gang, the Mad Angels, and takes a job at the harbor as a forklift driver to investigate. After he causes trouble, the Mad Angels kidnap his schoolfriend Nozomi. Ryo rescues her and makes a deal with the Mad Angels leader to beat up Guizhang in exchange for a meeting with Lan Di. Ryo realizes the deal is a trap and teams up with Guizhang to defeat the Mad Angels.

Ryo arranges to take a boat to Hong Kong with Guizhang. On the day of departure, they are attacked by Chai. Ryo defeats him, but Guizhang is injured and urges Ryo to go without him, saying he will meet him in China later. Chen advises Ryo to seek the help of a martial artist in Hong Kong named Lishao Tao. Ryo boards the boat and leaves for Hong Kong.

Development

Shenmue was created by Yu Suzuki. After joining Sega in 1983, Suzuki created several successful arcade games including Hang-On (1985), Out Run (1986) and Virtua Fighter (1993). In comparison to arcade games, where the ideal experience is only a few minutes long, Suzuki wanted to make a longer experience and researched role-playing games (RPGs).

To test camera, combat and conversation systems, he and Sega AM2 built a prototype Sega Saturn game, The Old Man and the Peach Tree, about a young man, Taro, seeking a martial arts grandmaster in 1950s Luoyang, China. Taro brings an old man a peach in exchange for information about the grandmaster; at the end of the game, the man skilfully skips stones across water to hunt fish, revealing that he is the grandmaster.

In 1996, AM2 began developing a 3D Saturn RPG with the working title Guppy. This became Virtua Fighter RPG: Akira's Story, an RPG starring the Virtua Fighter character Akira. AM2 planned a "cinematic" approach, including voice acting and elaborate combat sequences. Suzuki researched locations in China, and constructed four acts with the themes "sadness", "fight", "departure" and "starting afresh". In this version of the story, Akira would overcome his grief following his father's death, travel to China, defeat an antagonist, and begin a journey with a new friend. Suzuki recruited a screenwriter, a playwright and film directors to write the multi-part story, which IGN described as a "revenge epic in the tradition of Chinese cinema".

In 1997, development moved to Sega's upcoming console, the Dreamcast. In 1998, Sega of America vice president Bernie Stolar told Next Generation: "I can't tell you what Suzuki-san is working on. Let's just say that I've seen the project and it's going to rock the gaming world." The same year, to better market the game as a Dreamcast "killer app", the Virtua Fighter connection was dropped and Suzuki announced the working title Project Berkley. In November, Sega announced that Shenmue was so unique it belonged to a new genre it termed "full reactive eyes entertainment" or "FREE". By the time of the Dreamcast's release in Japan in November 1998, the game had been titled Shenmue.AM2 focused on developing the game world, creating a large open environment with minigames and subquests. The setting is modeled on Dobuita in Yokosuka, Japan. The team worked with interior decorators to design more than 1,200 rooms and locations, and created over 300 characters with their own names, personalities and relationships, some modeled on Sega employees, with detailed clay models as animation references. Meteorological records of 1986 Yokosuka were used to create algorithmically generated weather and day-and-night cycles. The cut scenes are rendered in real time, without full-motion video (FMV), and motion capture was used to capture the movements of Budō (Japanese martial arts) experts. To fit the material onto a manageable number of discs, AM2 developed a new type of data compression.

In 1999, AM2 focused on fixing bugs, finding hundreds each day. At the time, there were no bug-tracking systems, so the team tracked bugs with Excel spreadsheets; at one point, they had tracked over 10,000 unresolved bugs. On one occasion, several non-player characters became trapped in the convenience store where they had gone as part of their scripted routines; Suzuki's solution was to widen the store's door. The product placement of the Coca-Cola and Timex brands also created problems, as the companies had strict specifications for their implementation. Suzuki said the biggest challenge was management, with over 300 staff and no experience of large projects.

According to the localizer Jeremy Blaustein, Shenmues English localization was fraught with problems exacerbated by the project's scale. At Suzuki's insistence, the English voices were recorded in Japan, which greatly restricted the casting; Blaustein said "we hired basically every single [English-speaking] person that exists [in Japan] and calls themselves a voice actor". The scripts were translated by several people, creating consistency problems, and arrived late, leaving no time for rewrites or proper direction.

Shenmue became the most expensive game ever developed at the time, reported to have cost Sega . In 2011, Suzuki said the figure was closer to $47 million including marketing. Development also covered some of Shenmue II (2001), which was completed for a smaller amount, and groundwork for future Shenmue games.

Promotion and release 
On November 27, 1998, Sega released the Dreamcast in Japan. The launch game Virtua Fighter 3tb, also directed by Suzuki, included a preview disc of Shenmue featuring FMV scenes and an interview with Suzuki, but no gameplay footage. On December 20, 1998, Sega unveiled Shenmue at a conference at the Yokohama International Assembly Hall and demonstrated its clock, weather and quick time event systems; fans could watch the conference online. Initial reactions were positive, with Edge saying it "could be one of the most ambitious and important video game endeavours of the decade". However, the quick time events angered some fans, who had assumed the game would only use Virtua Fighter-style battles.

Sega announced a Japanese release date of April 1999, which was delayed to August 5. At the Tokyo Game Show in March 1999, Sega announced that Shenmue would span multiple games and allowed the public to play it for the first time. At a Japanese consumer show on May 3, 1999, Sega demonstrated the facial animation and announced that non-player characters would have their own daily routines. Later that month, Sega showed Shenmue in America for the first time at the 1999 Game Developer's Conference. It was playable the following week at the E3 trade fair in Los Angeles.

At a Japanese consumer conference on June 1, 1999, Sega announced a Shenmue promotion to coincide with a Dreamcast price drop. Sega distributed a limited-edition video, What's Shenmue, with Dreamcast consoles and games, and a playable demo from August 1. The "spoof" demo has Ryo search a small area of Yokosuka for Sega then-managing director Hidekazu Yukawa. Sega also announced that Shenmue had been delayed to October 28, 1999. On June 22, Sega announced a "Shenmue Subway Tour", showing playable demos at Japanese train stations that August. NHK spent six months with the development team and broadcast a making-of documentary about the game before its release.

At the end of September, Sega announced a release date for early 2000, before moving it ahead to the final week of 1999. Sega released Shenmue on December 29, 1999, in Japan, November 8, 2000, in North America, and December 1, 2000, in Europe.

Sales 
Shenmue sold 260,000 copies in its first week of release in Japan. It eventually sold 1.2 million copies and became the Dreamcast's fourth-bestselling game. However, its sales did not cover its development cost and analysts consider it a major commercial failure. It followed years of declining profits for Sega and contributed to Sega's exit from the game console market. USgamer wrote that though Shenmues sales would have been a success for most games, only an "impossible" number of sales would have seen Shenmue turn a profit. According to GamesRadar, every Dreamcast owner would have needed to buy Shenmue twice for it to turn a profit, and so "ironically it probably did as much to kill the Dreamcast as it did to cement its reputation".

The Shenmue localizer Jeremy Blaustein likened the failure to the epic 1980 film Heaven's Gate, which went drastically over budget and was a commercial failure: "Suzuki was coming off of huge past successes, and he was the man. And so this was going be the thing ... And everyone wanted a piece of that $70 million, you know? And of course that's like the worst thing you could do, is to start out a project saying we've got all this money, and then just keep throwing more money at it." Peter Moore, then-president of Sega of America, said Shenmue sold "extremely well" but could not make a profit due to the Dreamcast's limited installed base. Dreamcast engineer Hideki Sato defended Shenmue as an "investment [which] will someday be recouped" because the lessons learnt during development could be applied to other games.

Critical reception

Shenmue holds an average aggregate score of 89% on GameRankings. Critics praised its graphics, realism, soundtrack and ambition. IGN called it "a gaming experience that no one, casual to hardcore gamer, can miss", and Eurogamer called it "one of the most compelling and unusual gaming experiences ever created". GameSpot wrote that though Shenmue is "far from perfect" it was "revolutionary" and "worth experiencing—provided you have the time to invest". Edge initially called the Japanese version a "landmark"; they later said the English version was not the "milestone" they had hoped for, but was "involving, and ultimately rewarding".

Ed Lomas of the UK Official Dreamcast Magazine said the production values were "astounding ... [Shenmue] is the most beautiful game ever made, no doubt about it." Though he acknowledged problems with controls, dated QTEs, script and voice acting, he felt the experience as a whole was "incredible", particularly its immersion and the freedom to pursue the story at the player's pace. Jeff Lundrigan of Next Generation wrote: "Everyone on Earth owes it to themselves to play this. Some will enjoy it more than others, but no one will fail to recognize its magnificent production values and depth of design."

Several reviews criticized the invisible walls, abundance of cutscenes, English voice acting, and the inability to progress without waiting for scheduled events. GameSpot wrote that by "the time you're driving forklifts and participating in the game's QTE-filled conclusion, hours upon hours of boredom will have taken their toll". Game Informer criticized the lack of action, writing: "Determining your character's next move requires little more than talking to someone, who will then tell you who to see or where to go ... all that's left is a guy walking around an amazingly detailed environment. If I wanted to experience that, I could see it in another game with proven endless entertainment value. It's called life."

Awards 
Shenmue received the Excellence Prize for Interactive Art at the 2000 Japan Media Arts Festival. Edge awarded it for Graphical Achievement, stating that Suzuki's "experiment in creating what is a complete, populated virtual world in which a game occurs proves to be a mighty" success, particularly the "breathtaking" level of detail on the character models, and that never had there been "such a convincing representation of real life" built into a video game. GameSpot named it the most disappointing console game of 2000, but awarded it the prize for "Best Graphics, Technical" for a console game, and nominated it for "Best Adventure Game", "Best Sound" and "Best Graphics, Artistic".

Retrospective 
In 2009, IGN Xbox editor Hilary Goldstein praised Shenmue for its "great ideas", but said it was "ultimately uninteresting", and IGN Nintendo's Matt Casamassina felt it was "more of a technical demo than a coherent game". However, IGN UK's Martin Robinson described it as "a deeply personal game" that "opened my eyes to a whole new world for video games, suggesting that they didn't have to be about shooting aliens in the face, rescuing the princess or slaying orcs for hours on end—they could be about real people in a real place ... it's the mundane moments that gave Shenmue its poetry."
In 2011, Empire wrote that "the digital environment created by Shenmue was revolutionary at the time ... Even by today's standards, its rich and affectionate vision of urban Japan is inspiring." In his 2010 book 1001 Video Games You Must Play Before You Die, David McCarthy wrote of Shenmue's "paradigmatic impact on the entire video game industry"; according to McCarthy, while it appears "crude and blocky" compared to modern games, it "recreated the real world with ... attention to detail that has never been rivaled." In a 2014 retrospective, Edge wrote that "some were entranced by the game's abounding atmosphere and visual detail. Others left frozen by clumpy interaction with an unthreatening, almost rustic world ... where they'd wander the districts of Yokosuka while asking unusual questions to pensioners and hairdressers." In the same year, The Guardian wrote: "[Shenmues] pacing might be glacial compared to the rollercoaster tempo of Uncharted, but slowing things down allows for a greater appreciation of everything that Suzuki and Sega's AM2 department achieved here ... how everything is held together remains quite exquisite, under the closest scrutiny, even by 2014 standards."

Reviews of the HD ports of Shenmue and Shenmue II in 2018 were less positive. Destructoids Peter Glagowski wrote that Shenmue had "interesting concepts that are marred by poor execution", and criticized the combat and slow pacing. He concluded: "This open-world design was truly original and fascinating in 1999, but there really wasn't a need to include half of the features that Shenmue has." The Escapist critic Ben "Yahtzee" Croshaw disliked the "relentless" and "frenetic" combat, and felt that the open world lacked content between key story moments. The critic Jim Sterling wrote that "Shenmue is dreadful [...] Maybe at the turn of the millennium when this game was worth a shit it could get away with being bold, but boldness is no excuse for wasting the player's time, having absolutely no respect for the audience or its patience, and generally expecting people to make their own fun in a game that doesn't really give all that many tools to have fun with."

Shenmue attracted a cult following. Fans visit Dobuita Street in Yokosuka, where most of the game is set. It has been included in several lists of the greatest games of all time. Edge placed it number 50 in its 2007 list of the top 100 games. In 2008, it was voted #25 on Game's "Greatest Games of All Time" reader poll of over 100,000 votes. In 2006 and 2008, IGN readers voted Shenmue and Shenmue II #81 and #63, respectively, in the "Readers' Choice Top 100 Games Ever" list. In April 2011, Empire ranked Shenmue the 42nd-best video game of all time. In April 2013, Den of Geek ranked Shenmue and Shenmue II the joint-best Dreamcast games. In September 2013, readers of the German games magazine M! Games voted Shenmue the best game of all time. In October 2013, MSN UK named it one of the 20 best games of all time. In 2014, Shenmue was the 71st best game ever by Slant Magazine and the seventh by Empire.

Influence
Shenmue is credited for pioneering several game technologies. In its list of "Top 5 Underappreciated Innovators", 1UP.com credited it as the original "open-world city game" before the idea was popularized by games such as Grand Theft Auto III (2001). Its large environments, wealth of options and level of detail have been compared to later sandbox games including Grand Theft Auto, Yakuza, Fallout 3 and Deadly Premonition. Shenmue is also credited for naming and popularizing the quick time event, which games including Resident Evil, God of War and Tomb Raider would incorporate.

Sequels
Suzuki plans Shenmue to cover at least four games. Shenmue II, developed simultaneously with Shenmue, was released in 2001 in Japan and Europe and 2002 in North America. It was also a commercial failure, and Shenmue III entered a period of development hell lasting over a decade. In 2004, Sega announced a massively multiplayer online role-playing game for PC set in the Shenmue world, Shenmue Online, but it was never released. In 2010, Sega announced another spin-off, Shenmue City, a social game for the Yahoo Mobage mobile service; it was shut down in late 2011.

In September 2011, Suzuki left Sega to focus on his development studio Ys Net. At the E3 conference on June 15, 2015, he announced a Kickstarter crowdfunding campaign to develop Shenmue III with Ys Net for PlayStation 4, and Windows having licensed the rights from Sega. The campaign reached its initial $2 million goal in just under nine hours. On July 17, 2015, Shenmue III became the fastest-funded and highest-funded video game project in Kickstarter history, raising $6.3 million in total. It was released on November 19, 2019.

Port 
A remake of Shenmue and Shenmue II, featuring new models, textures and lighting, was canceled in 2017 due to technical problems. On August 21, 2018, Sega released high-definition ports of Shenmue and Shenmue II for PlayStation 4, Windows, and Xbox One. The ports include new graphics and control options, improved user interfaces, and Japanese and English voices. Some details, such as product placement, are omitted, and cutscenes are presented in their original aspect ratio due to technical limitations.

The ports were released in Japan on November 22, 2018, and debuted at number four on the Japanese charts with 37,529 retail sales on PlayStation 4. They remained among the top 20 bestselling games in Japan until December 2, 2018, having sold almost 45,000 copies.

Other media
Sega released a soundtrack album, Shenmue Orchestra Version, on April 1, 1999, before the game's release. A two-disc soundtrack album, Shenmue OST Chapter 1: Yokosuka, was released on March 23, 2000. A compilation film of Shenmues cutscenes, Shenmue: The Movie, was released theatrically in Japan in 2001 and packaged with the Xbox version of Shenmue II. An anime adaptation of Shenmue premiered on February 6, 2022.

Notes

References

External links

Shenmue at Mobygames

1999 video games
Action-adventure games
Cancelled Sega Saturn games
Christmas video games
Dreamcast games
Interactive Achievement Award winners
Life simulation games
Open-world video games
PlayStation 4 games
Shenmue
Single-player video games
Social simulation video games
Video games about revenge
Video games designed by Yu Suzuki
Video games developed in Japan
Video games scored by Takenobu Mitsuyoshi
Video games scored by Yuzo Koshiro
Video games set in 1986
Video games set in 1987
Video games set in Japan
Windows games
Xbox One games
Yokosuka, Kanagawa in fiction
Video games based on Chinese mythology
Video games with alternate endings